The 2018–19 Women's Basketball Super League was the 39th edition of the top-tier level professional women's basketball league in Turkey. Fenerbahçe were the defending champions.

Player movement

Regular season

Standings

Results 
<div style="overflow:auto">

Playoffs

Turkish clubs in European competitions

References

External links 

Official Site

Turkish Women's Basketball League seasons
Women
Turkey
basketball
basketball